Octavio Jibrán Colmenares Fayad (born 19 August 1989) is a Mexican former footballer who played as a goalkeeper.

Club career
He made his debut for Universidad de Chile in May 2009 against Cobresal.

In the 2010 Liga de Ascenso Apertura season he made one league appearance for Pumas Morelos.

Personal life
His father of the same name, is a Mexican businessman who was one of the main stockholders of Universidad de Chile when he was a player of them.

He naturalized Chilean by residence, since he came to Chile at the age of fourteen.

Honours

Club
Universidad de Chile
Primera División de Chile (1): 2009 Apertura

See also
Football in Mexico
List of football clubs in Mexico

References

External links
 
 
 Octavio Colmenares at PlaymakerStats.com
 

1989 births
Living people
Footballers from Mexico City
Mexican footballers
Mexican expatriate footballers
Chilean Primera División players
Primera B de Chile players
Universidad de Chile footballers
Everton de Viña del Mar footballers
A.C. Barnechea footballers
Ascenso MX players
Club Universidad Nacional footballers
Expatriate footballers in Chile
Mexican expatriate sportspeople in Chile
Association football goalkeepers
Naturalized citizens of Chile